Alias Jimmy Valentine is a 1920 American silent crime drama film starring Bert Lytell, directed by Edmund Mortimer and Arthur Ripley, and released through Metro Pictures.

The film was based on a 1910 stage play by Paul Armstrong, which in turn was based on the 1903 short story "A Retrieved Reformation" by O. Henry. An earlier version of the play was filmed in 1915, and a later version, also called Alias Jimmy Valentine (1928) and starring William Haines, was produced by Metro-Goldwyn-Mayer.

Plot
Based upon a review in a film magazine, Jimmy Valentine (Lytell), a prisoner in Sing Sing for safe-cracking, although guilty, maintains his innocence. When he obtains a pardon, he goes straight, influenced by a beautiful girl (Vale). He assumes a new identity as Lee Randall and diligently works at a bank for three years. When he is about to get married, Detective Doyle comes to town with proof of Valentine's guilt. However, the Randall identity is complete, and just as the detective is convinced and about to leave, word comes that a little girl is trapped in the bank safe and no one has the combination. Although the detective is nearby, Valentine uses his skills to open the safe, knowing that it will give away his identity. After the girl is rescued, the detective decides to leave without arresting Valentine.

Cast
 Bert Lytell - Lee Randall/Jimmy Valentine
 Vola Vale - Rose Lane
 Eugene Pallette - 'Red' Jocelyn
 Wilton Taylor - Detective Doyle
 Marc Robbins - Bill Avery
 Robert Dunbar - Lt. Gov. Fay
 Winter Hall - William Lane
 Jim Farley - Cotton

Preservation status
This 1920 film is now considered a lost film.

See also
 Alias Jimmy Valentine (radio program)

References

External links

 
 

1920 films
American silent feature films
American films based on plays
Lost American films
American black-and-white films
1920 crime drama films
Films directed by Edmund Mortimer
American crime drama films
1920 lost films
1920s American films